Félix Roosemont (born 14 May 1925) was a Belgian basketball player. He competed in the men's tournament at the 1952 Summer Olympics.

References

External links
 

1925 births
Possibly living people
Belgian men's basketball players
Olympic basketball players of Belgium
Basketball players at the 1952 Summer Olympics
Place of birth missing